Was (Not Was) is the debut album by art-funk ensemble Was (Not Was); it was released in 1981.
The album was re-released with additional material in 2004 under the name Out Come the Freaks. The art direction was by Maverse Players.

Track listing

1981 release
All tracks composed by David Was and Don Was; except where indicated

Side A
 "Out Come the Freaks" – 5:41 vocals - Harry Bowens; spoken vocals - Marzanne McCants
 "Where Did Your Heart Go?" – 4:55 lead vocals - Sweet Pea Atkinson
 "Tell Me That I'm Dreaming" – 4:58 lead vocals - Harry Bowens
 "Oh, Mr. Friction!" – 3:31

Side B
 "Carry Me Back to Old Morocco" (Was, Was, Doug Fieger) – 6:01
 "It's an Attack!" (Was, Was, David Goss) – 3:11 lead vocals - Sweet Pea Atkinson
 "The Sky's Ablaze" – 2:16
 "Go...Now!" (Was, Was, Ron Banks) – 5:34 lead vocals - Sweet Pea Atkinson
Side B of the LP ends in a lock groove of Atkinson singing "'Cause he says it hurts his neck" (from "Out Come the Freaks"), looping on the last three words.

Out Come the Freaks
 "Wheel Me Out" (Long Version) – 7:06
 "Out Come the Freaks" – 5:39
 "Where Did Your Heart Go?" – 4:57
 "Tell Me That I'm Dreaming" – 5:00
 "Oh, Mr. Friction" – 3:33
 "Carry Me Back to Old Morocco" – 6:01
 "It's an Attack!" – 3:10
 "The Sky's Ablaze" – 2:15
 "Go...Now!" – 5:30
 "Hello Operator" (Short Version) – 2:51
 "Out Come the Freaks (Again)" – 4:37
 "Tell Me That I'm Dreaming" (12" Remix)" – 7:48
 "Out Come the Freaks" (12" Remix) – 7:10
 "(Return to the Valley Of) Out Come the Freaks" (Semi/Historic 1983 Version) – 4:20
 "Christmas Time in Motor City" – 2:55
 "Out Come the Freaks" (Dub Version) – 6:30

Personnel
David Was - vocals, alto saxophone, piano
Don Was - vocals, bass, vibraphone, Moog synthesizer, clavinet
Sir Harry Bowens - lead vocals on "Out Come the Freaks" and "Tell Me That I'm Dreaming"
Sweet Pea Atkinson - lead vocals on "Where Did Your Heart Go?", "It's an Attack" and "Go...Now!"
Bruce Nazarian, Ricardo Rouse, Wayne Kramer - guitar
Jervonny Collier, Lamont Johnson - bass 
Bruce Nazarian - bass on "Wheel Me Out"
Franklin K. Funklyn McCullers, Jerry Jones - drums
Larry Fratangelo, Kevin Tschirhart - percussion
Carl "Butch" Small - percussion, rap vocals
Gary Stuck, Jim Matthews, Les Chambers - additional percussion
Irwin Krinsky - piano
Luis Resto - piano, Oberheim OBX and ARP synthesizers
Raymond Johnson, Mark Johnson - keyboards
David McMurray - tenor, soprano and alto saxophone
Armand Angeloni - tenor saxophone, piccolo flute
Marcus Belgrave - trumpet, flugelhorn 
Mack Pitt - mandolin
Carol Hall, Carolyn Crawford, Kathy Kosins, Michelle Goulet, Sheila Horne - backing vocals
Anthony Was, Kim Heron, Lamont Zodiac, Mark J. Norton, Mitchell Jacobs, Mrs. Martinez's Fifth Hour Vocal Music Class/Birney Middle School, Pam Schlom, Richard Pinkston, Rick Cushingberry, Rubin Weiss, Ruth Seymore, Tom Brzezina - additional vocals
Johnny Allen - string arrangement on "Where Did Your Heart Go?"
Michael Zilkha - Executive Producer

References

1981 debut albums
Was (Not Was) albums
Albums produced by Don Was
Albums produced by David Was
Island Records albums
ZE Records albums